Aletheia McCaskill (born September 30, 1971) is an American politician and union activist who is a member of the Maryland House of Delegates for District 44B in Baltimore County, Maryland. She was previously a candidate for District 44 of the Maryland Senate in 2018.

Background 
McCaskill graduated from Carver Vo-Tech High School in 1989. She later attended Villa Julie College, where she earned a Bachelor of Science degree in information systems in 1994, the Community College of Baltimore County, receiving an associate degree in early childhood development in 2010, and the Notre Dame of Maryland University, where she received a Bachelor of Science degree in early elementary education in 2021.

McCaskill is the vice president of the SEIU Local 500 labor union, which represents teachers, child-care professionals, and part-time college faculty in Maryland and Washington, D.C. She previously served as the leader of the union's bargaining committee and as the chairwoman of its Committee on Political Education (COPE). She also previously worked as a early-learning and child-development specialist.

In September 2017, McCaskill announced that she would run for Maryland Senate in District 44, challenging incumbent state senator Shirley Nathan-Pulliam. In November 2017, McCaskill graduated from Emerge Maryland, a group dedicated to training and electing Democratic women to office. Her candidacy was endorsed by SEIU Local 500 1199SEIU, and gubernatorial candidate Ben Jealous. Despite an aggressive primary campaign, McCaskill lost to Nathan-Pulliam in the Democratic primary by a more than 2-1 margin.

In 2022, McCaskill ran for the Maryland House of Delegates in District 44B. She came in second place alongside incumbent Sheila Ruth, receiving 23.0 percent of the vote in the Democratic primary. She was unopposed in the general election.

In the legislature 
McCaskill was sworn into the Maryland House of Delegates on January 11, 2023, with the start of the Maryland General Assembly's 445th legislative session. He is a member of the House Appropriations Committee.

Political positions

Minimum wage 
During the 2016 Baltimore mayoral election, McCaskill canvassed for then-mayoral candidate Catherine Pugh, motivated by her support for a bill to raise the city's minimum wage to $15 an hour by 2022. She was disheartened by Pugh's veto of said bill.

During her 2018 state senate campaign, McCaskill said she would support raising the state's minimum wage to $15 an hour.

Electoral history

References

External links
 

1971 births
21st-century African-American women
21st-century African-American politicians
21st-century American politicians
21st-century American women politicians
African-American state legislators in Maryland
African-American women in politics
Community College of Baltimore County alumni
Democratic Party members of the Maryland House of Delegates
Living people
Notre Dame of Maryland University alumni
Stevenson University alumni
Trade unionists from Maryland
Women state legislators in Maryland